Grainer is a surname. Notable people with the surname include:

 Bill Grainer, American songwriter and producer
 Franz Grainer (1871–1948), German photographer
 Ron Grainer (1922–1981), UK-based Australian composer

See also
 Grainger (surname)
 Rainer (surname)